Zanget may refer to:
 Zanget-e Olya
 Zanget-e Sofla